Fabiola (UK title: The Fighting Gladiator) is a 1949 Italian language motion picture historical drama directed by Alessandro Blasetti, very loosely based on the 1854 novel Fabiola by Nicholas Patrick Wiseman. The film stars Michèle Morgan, Henri Vidal and Michel Simon. It tells the story of the Roman Empire in which Christianity is growing around the 4th century AD.  An unofficial remake, The Revolt of the Slaves (La Rivolta degli Schiavi), was released in 1960, with Lang Jeffries and Rhonda Fleming, only with Rhual's name changed to Vibio.

Plot
In ancient Rome a love story blossoms between Fabiola, daughter of a senator, and Rhual, a Gallic gladiator. When Fabiola's father is killed, the Romans blame the Christians and the persecution begins. Rhual confesses to be a Christian and is accused of the murder and sentenced to fight to death in the arena.

312 AD. Rhual, a young and athletic Gaul, is invited to take part in the gladiator games at the seaside villa of Senator Fabius Severus, near Rome. Secretly, Rhual is an agent of Emperor Constantine who wishes to establish Christianity in the Roman Empire, and Fabius is leading a movement for religious tolerance and the freeing of slaves. In the villa gardens Rhual meets and falls in love with a beautiful girl whom he later discovers to be Fabiola, the senator's daughter. Fabius is murdered during the night by reactionary politicians opposed to Christianity, and the Christians are blamed for the murder. Fabiola suspects Rhual to be one of the Christian assassins, but at their trial he appears in their defence. However, the Christians together with Rhual are found guilty and sentenced to death in the arena. So begin the persecutions during which many Christians are killed or imprisoned. The centurion Sebastian of the Praetorian Guard, denounced as a Christian, dies as a martyr. Fabiola obtains Rhual's freedom, but he at first rejects her. The situation is redeemed, however, when Fabiola declares herself to be on the side of the Christians and joins them in the arena, thereby indicating they were not responsible for her father's death. Rhual is forced to fight several gladiators, but does not attempt to kill them. Eventually, the gladiators follow his example and throw down their arms. Meanwhile, the advance troops of Constantine arrive at the city walls and there is a general uprising. Peace returns to Rome, and the imperial banners display the sign of Christ.

Principal cast
Michèle Morgan as  Fabiola 
Henri Vidal as  Rual 
Michel Simon as  Fabio 
Louis Salou as  Fulvio 
Elisa Cegani as  Sira 
Massimo Girotti as  Sebastiano 
Gino Cervi as  Quadrato
Sergio Tofano as   Luciano
Rina Morelli as   Faustina
Paolo Stoppa as  Manlio Valerio
Carlo Ninchi as   Galba
Franco Interlenghi as   Corvino
Guglielmo Barnabò as  Antonio Leto
Aldo Silvani as   Cassiano
Silvana Jachino as   Lucilla 
Goliarda Sapienza as   Cecilia
Virgilio Riento as   Pietro
Ludmilla Dudarova as   Giulia 
Gabriele Ferzetti as Claudio
Nerio Bernardi as  Imperial  messenger

Reception
The film earned an estimated $1,050,000 in rentals at the US box office in 1951.

See also
List of historical drama films
List of films set in ancient Rome

References

External links

Fabiola at Films de France

Fabiola at Variety Distribution

1949 films
1940s historical films
Italian historical films
French historical films
Italian epic films
French epic films
Peplum films
French black-and-white films
Italian black-and-white films
Films based on British novels
Films directed by Alessandro Blasetti
Films set in ancient Rome
Films set in the Roman Empire
Films set in the 4th century
Religious epic films
Films with screenplays by Suso Cecchi d'Amico
Films with screenplays by Cesare Zavattini
Sword and sandal films
Films scored by Enzo Masetti
1940s Italian films
1940s French films